Hosne Ara Rahman ( 1934 – 17 June 2017) was a Bangladeshi public figure, former First Lady of Bangladesh, and the wife of former President Abdur Rahman Biswas. Rahman served as the country's First Lady from 10 October 1991, until 9 October 1996.

Rahman died from complications of old age at United Hospital in Dhaka, Bangladesh, on 17 June 2017, at the age of 83. She was survived by her husband, former President Abdur Rahman Biswas, their two daughters, Akhi Biswas and Rakhi Biswas, and four of their five sons - Monu Biswas, Shamsuddoza Kamal Biswas, Jamilur Rahman Shibli Biswas, and Muidur Rahman Romel Biswas. She was also a cousin of Rashed Khan Menon, the Minister for Civil Aviation and Tourism. Her funeral rites were held at the Gulshan Azad Mosque in Gulshan Thana with burial at the Banani Graveyard.

Her widower, Abdur Rahman Biswas, died just months later on 3 November 2017. He was also buried in Banani Graveyard.

References

1934 births
2017 deaths
First Ladies of Bangladesh
Burials at Banani Graveyard
People from Dhaka